

The DAR-9 Siniger, was a trainer produced in Bulgaria during World War II.

Design and development
To provide the Bulgarian Air Force with a modern trainer, DAR took out a licence to build the Focke-Wulf Fw 44J. The first series, powered by a Siemens-Halske Sh 14 radial engine, was built at the DAR factory, but subsequent series were built at the DSF (Derzhavna Samoletna Fabrika)

Surviving aircraft in 1948 were re-engined with Walter Minor 6.III inline engines due to difficulty in procuring spares and the poor condition of the Siemens-Halske engines.

DAR 9 production consisted of the series 1, which was built at the DAR factory and which carried the construction numbers 88 to 93 and Series 2 to Series 5, built at the DSF factory and which carried construction numbers 95 to 130.

Operational history
The DAR 9s were used for training at the Kazanlak Air School until at least 1949. Nine surplus DAR 9s were transferred to the Yugoslavian Air Force in 1947, withdrawn from service by 1958. One DAR 9 is preserved at the Technicki Muzej, Zagreb, Croatia.

Variants
DAR 9
Initial designation of the Sh-14-powered aircraft.
DAR 9A
Aircraft re-engined with Walter Minor 6.III engines were redesignated DAR 9A.

Operators

 Bulgarian Air Force
Kazanlak Air School

 Yugoslavian Air Force

Specifications (DAR 9)

References

Bibliography 

 Insignia Issue 9 August 1998 pp26–31
 Wings of Fame Vol.13

External links

 DAR DAR-9 Siniger

World War II Bulgarian aircraft
1940s Bulgarian military trainer aircraft
Siniger
Single-engined tractor aircraft
Biplanes